Leroy Errol Brooks (known as Errol; born 1951) was the 12th Bishop of Antigua; his See was NECA (Anglican Diocese of North East Caribbean and Aruba).

Brooks was born in 1951 and educated at Codrington College and the University of the West Indies. He was ordained in 1974 and began his career as a curate at St. John's Cathedral, St. John's, the church at which he was to be consecrated coadjutor bishop in 1994 and became diocesan in 1996.

References

1951 births
Alumni of Codrington College
University of the West Indies alumni
20th-century Anglican bishops in the Caribbean
21st-century Anglican bishops in the Caribbean
Anglican bishops of Antigua
Living people